A Nicaraguan American (nicaragüense-estadounidense,  or ) is an American of Nicaraguan descent. They are also referred to as "nica" or "nicoya".

The Nicaraguan American population at the 2010 Census was 348,202. Nicaraguans are the eleventh largest Hispanic group in the United States and the fourth largest Central American population.

More than two-thirds of the Nicaraguan population in the U.S. resides in California or Florida.

In California, Nicaraguans are more dominant in the Greater Los Angeles Area and San Francisco Bay Area. Large populations also reside in the Inland Empire and the cities of Sacramento, San Diego, and San Jose.

In Florida, 90% of Nicaraguans reside in the Miami Metropolitan Area. Miami-Dade County is home to 30% of Nicaraguans residing in the United States.

Immigrational history

Nicaraguans have immigrated to the United States in small groups since the early 1900s, but their presence was especially felt over the last three decades of the 20th century. The Nicaraguan community is mainly concentrated in three major urban areas: Metropolitan Miami, Greater Los Angeles, and San Francisco Bay Area.  A more affluent group of Nicaraguan Americans reside in the New York metropolitan area.

According to Immigration and Naturalization Service figures, 23,261 Nicaraguans were admitted as permanent residents between 1976 and 1985; 75,264 were admitted between 1986 and 1993; and 94,582 between 1994 and 2002, with a total of 193,107 Nicaraguan immigrants being granted legal status since 1976.

The earliest documents of immigration from Nicaragua to the United States was combined in total with those of other Central American countries. However, according to the U.S. Census Bureau some 7,500 Nicaraguans legally immigrated from 1967 to 1976. An estimated 28,620 Nicaraguans were living in the U.S. in 1970, 90% of which self-reported as white on the 1970 census. Most Nicaraguan immigrants during the late 1960s were women: there were only 60 male Nicaraguan immigrants for every 100 female immigrants during this period.  Most Central Americans were denied refugee asylum status during the 1980s. While the U.S. Refugee Act of 1980 wanted to favor U.S. foreign policy to help political asylum seekers it mostly favored only Eastern Bloc or Communist nations or countries in the Middle East. "Asylum decisions with respect to Salvadorans and Guatemalans reflected U.S. foreign policy, which supported their governments" such as U.S. involvement in regime change in Latin America. Many Nicaraguans were rejected despite the Reagan Administration’s stance on helping political refugees. “During the early 1980s, approximately 10 percent of Nicaraguan applicants, compared to 2 to 3 percent of those from El Salvador and Guatemala, received asylum.”

Over 62 percent of the total documented immigration from 1979 to 1988 occurred after 1984. In 1998 more than two million Nicaraguans were left homeless due to hurricane Mitch, as a result many Nicaraguans received permanent residence or temporary protected status (TPS) in the late 1990s.

According to the 1990 U.S. Census 168,659 of the total 202,658 documented Nicaraguans in the U.S. were born in Nicaragua. In 1992 approximately 10–12% of the Nicaraguan population had emigrated. These emigrants tended to be disproportionately of working age, better educated, and more often white-collar workers than non-migrants. In addition, emigrants were more likely to come from larger premigration households and higher income households.

Motives for Immigration

The Sandinista revolution that started in the mid-1970s and the Contra war that followed brought the first large waves of Nicaraguan refugees into the U.S. As a result of the de-privatization reforms under the Sandinista National Liberation Front (FSLN)'s rule (from 1979 to 1990), the first wave of approximately 120,000 Nicaraguans left Nicaragua and entered the United States.

They consisted mainly of large landholders, industrialists, and managers of North American enterprises. Many Nicaraguan upper-class exiles had economic roots in the United States and in Miami before the upheaval. This phase of upper-class arrivals included exiled dictator Anastasio Somoza Debayle and his family, who owned homes in Miami and were among the richest people in Florida (ibid).

Another major wave of Nicaraguans to the United States, consisting primarily of blue collar workers, peaked in the dramatic exodus of early 1989. Again, their motivation for migration was to escape from both political and economic torment in their homeland. By the late 1980s, the war, Hurricane Joan in 1988, and a severe drought in 1989 left the country in economic ruins. Many of these Nicaraguan immigrants settled in poor and deteriorated sections of Miami, where struggling Cubans who came during the Mariel boatlift exodus of 1980 had previously lived.

Many Nicaraguans who immigrated did so to escape poverty. In Santa Clara County, California, the Nicaraguan public benefits recipients reported that in their families, 43% have one self-employed person or business owner, and 14% of the families have two such persons.

Cultural 
Nicaraguan Americans are Spanish-speaking and predominately Catholic. They celebrate the patron saints of the Roman Catholic Church with festivals and processions, which also provide a context for artistic and cultural expressions of the local identity. The most important patronal festivals for communities in Florida include Santa Ana, San Sebastian, La Purisima, San Jeronimo and La Griteria. Nicaragua is one of the most traditionalist countries in the Americas and so the majority of Nicaraguans define themselves as socially conservatives regardless of party affiliations or place of residence within the United States.

Demographics 

Outside of California and Florida, Nicaraguans can also be found in New York City, New Orleans Metro, and the Washington Metropolitan Area. Cities with noticeable Nicaraguan populations also include Charlotte, Houston, Jersey City, and Camden, New Jersey, Milwaukee, Wisconsin and Madison, Wisconsin. The Amigos de las Americas program set in motion by John F. Kennedy in the early 1960s promoted the sisterhood between states of the U.S. and third world countries. Wisconsin is the original sister State to Nicaragua. Employment and Student exchange programs in the past were the main reason for the first Nicaraguan to arrive and settle in that Midwest State.

States 
The 10 states with the largest population of Nicaraguans (Source: 2010 Census):
 Florida - 135,143
 California - 100,790
 Texas - 19,817
 New York - 13,006
 New Jersey - 8,222
 Maryland- 8,196
 Virginia - 7,388
 Louisiana - 6,390
 North Carolina - 4,964
 Georgia - 4,787

Areas 
The largest population of Nicaraguans are situated in the following areas (Source: Census 2010):
 Miami-Fort Lauderdale-West Palm Beach, FL MSA - 118,768
 Los Angeles-Long Beach-Santa Ana, CA MSA - 40,607
 San Francisco-Oakland-Fremont, CA MSA - 30,807
 New York-Northern New Jersey-Long Island, NY-NJ-PA MSA - 17,987
 Washington-Arlington-Alexandria, DC-VA-MD-WV MSA - 14,187
 Riverside-San Bernardino-Ontario, CA MSA - 9,793
 Houston-Sugar Land-Baytown, TX MSA - 9,496
 New Orleans-Metairie-Kenner, LA MSA - 5,310
 San Jose-Sunnyvale-Santa Clara, CA MSA - 4,540
 Orlando-Kissimmee-Sanford, FL MSA - 4,083
 Dallas-Fort Worth-Arlington, TX MSA - 3,964
 Atlanta-Sandy Springs-Marietta, GA MSA - 3,719
 Las Vegas-Paradise, NV MSA - 3,587
 Sacramento-Arden-Arcade-Roseville, CA MSA - 3,269
 Philadelphia-Camden-Wilmington, PA-NJ-DE-MD MSA - 3,163
 Chicago-Joliet-Naperville, IL-IN-WI MSA - 2,928
 Tampa-St. Petersburg-Clearwater, FL MSA - 2,589
 Phoenix-Mesa-Glendale, AZ MSA - 2,169
 San Diego-Carlsbad-San Marcos, CA MSA - 2,025
 Charlotte-Gastonia-Rock Hill, NC-SC MSA - 1,912
 Vallejo-Fairfield, CA MSA - 1,750
 Austin-Round Rock-San Marcos, TX MSA - 1,714
 Seattle-Tacoma-Bellevue, WA MSA - 1,635
 San Antonio-New Braunfels, TX MSA - 1,547
 Boston-Cambridge-Quincy, MA-NH MSA - 1,438

U.S. communities with largest population of people of Nicaraguan ancestry 

The top 25 U.S. communities with the highest populations of Nicaraguans (Source: Census 2010)

 Miami - 28,618
 Los Angeles - 15,572
 Hialeah, Florida - 10,410
 San Francisco - 7,604
 Fontainebleau, Florida - 6,738
 Houston, Texas - 4,226
 Kendale Lakes, Florida - 3,560
 Tamiami, Florida - 3,476
 Sweetwater, Florida - 3,102
 San Jose, California - 2,917
 Kendall, Florida - 2,629
 The Hammocks, Florida - 2,391
 Kendall West, Florida - 2,265
 Miami Gardens, Florida - 2,134
 West Little River, Florida - 2,112
 Richmond West, Florida - 2,039
 Miami Lakes, Florida - 1,772
 Hayward, California - 1,745
 Miramar, Florida - 1,691
 South San Francisco, California - 1,639
 South Miami Heights, Florida - 1,585
 Metairie, Louisiana - 1,462
 Pembroke Pines, Florida - 1,423
 Homestead, Florida - 1,354
 Hialeah Gardens and Hollywood, Florida - 1,321

U.S. communities with high percentages of people of Nicaraguan ancestry 
The top 25 U.S. communities with the highest percentages of Nicaraguans as a percent of total population (Source: Census 2010)
 Sweetwater, Florida - 22.98%
 Fontainebleau, Florida - 11.27%
 Miami, Florida - 7.16%
 Richmond West, Florida - 6.38%
 Kendale Lakes, Florida - 6.34%
 Tamiami, Florida - 6.29%
 Kendall West, Florida - 6.26%
 West Little River, Florida - 6.09%
 Hialeah Gardens, Florida - 6.08%
 Brownsville, Florida - 5.66%
 Stock Island, Florida - 5.66%
 Medley, Florida - 4.89%
 Princeton, Florida - 4.89%
 Gladeview, Florida - 4.83%
 The Hammocks, Florida - 4.69%
 Hialeah, Florida - 4.63%
 South Miami Heights, Florida - 4.44%
 University Park, Florida - 4.32%
 Rollingwood, California - 4.14%
 Palmetto Estates, Florida - 4.13%
 Colma, California - 4.02%
 Miami Lakes, Florida and Country Walk, Florida - 3.90%
 The Crossings, Florida - 3.89%
 Country Club, Florida - 3.76%
 Westwood Lakes, Florida - 3.72%

Notable people

Alex Blandino, MLB player
Marvin Benard, MLB player
Maurice Benard, actor on American soap operas All My Children and General Hospital
Bella Blue, burlesque dancer
Nastassja Bolívar, winner of Nuestra Belleza Latina 2011 and Miss Nicaragua 2013, and Top 16 finalist at Miss Universe 2013
Randy Caballero, professional boxer
 Barbara Carrera, actress, best known for her roles as Bond girl Fatima Blush in Never Say Never Again and as Angelica Nero on the soap opera Dallas
Oswaldo Castillo, actor
Michael Cordúa restaurateur, entrepreneur, businessman, and award winning self-taught chef
DJ Craze, only DJ in history to win 3 consecutive World DMC Champion titles
Salomón de la Selva, poet, author of Tropical Town and Other Poems
Franck de Las Mercedes, painter
Miguel D'Escoto, Roman Catholic priest and former foreign minister
Omar D'León, painter and poet
Edward'O, astrologer and co-host of 12 Corazones
Luis Enrique, salsa singer
Bill Guerin, NHL hockey player for the Pittsburgh Penguins
Bianca Jagger, human rights advocate and ex-wife of Mick Jagger
Diana López, Olympic bronze medalist in the sport of taekwondo
Mark López, Olympic silver medalist in the sport of taekwondo
Steven López, two-time Olympic gold medalist in the sport of taekwondo
Dennis Martínez, MLB player (1976–1998)
Camilo Mejía, former Staff Sergeant of the Florida National Guard and anti-war activist
Tony Meléndez, singer, composer, writer and musician who was born with no arms
Christianne Meneses Jacobs, publisher of Iguana, the United States' only Spanish-language magazine for children
Ana Navarro, Republican strategist and political commentator
David Obregón, professional boxer
Horacio Peña, professor, writer, and poet
Eddy Piñeiro, NFL placekicker
Claudia Poll, Nicaraguan-born swimmer
Silvia Poll, Nicaraguan-born swimmer
Hope Portocarrero, former First Lady of Nicaragua (1967–1978)
James Quesada, anthropologist and professor
Mari Ramos, weather anchor for CNN
Tammy Rivera, singer and television personality 
J Smooth, bilingual hip hop and reggaeton singer
Hilda Solis, U.S. congresswoman and the 25th United States Secretary of Labor
Anastasio Somoza Portocarrero, son of former Nicaraguan president Anastasio Somoza Debayle and Hope Portocarrero
T-Bone, rapper
Torombolo, reggaeton singer
Eve Torres, WWE Diva, professional wrestler
Gabriel Traversari, actor, director, writer, singer, songwriter and painter
Donald Vega, jazz musician and composer
Claudio Villanueva, University of Utah professor
Eddy Pineiro, placekicker in the NFL for the Chicago Bears
Jason Gonzalez UFC, mixed martial arts
Shakira Barrera, actress

See also
Nicaragua–United States relations

References

Further reading
 Cerar, K. Melissa, ed. Teenage Refugees from Nicaragua Speak Out (Rosen, 1995).
 Funkhouser, Edward. “Migration from Nicaragua: Some Recent Evidence.” World Development 20, no. 8 (1992): 1209–18.
 Hamilton, Nora, and Norma Stoltz Chinchilla. "Central American migration: A framework for analysis." Latin American Research Review 26.1 (1991): 75-110. online
 Lundquist, Jennifer H., and Douglas S. Massey. "Politics or economics? International migration during the Nicaraguan Contra War." Journal of Latin American Studies 37.1 (2005): 29-53. online
 Malone, Michael R. A Nicaraguan Family (Lerner Publications Co., 1998).
 Smagula, Stefan. "Nicaraguan Americans." Gale Encyclopedia of Multicultural America, edited by Thomas Riggs, (3rd ed., vol. 3, Gale, 2014), pp. 315-327. online

External links
 Historical Museum Folklife of Miami's Nicaraguan Communities

Hispanic and Latino American